Kypshak, also known as Azhibeksor, is a salt lake in Nura District, Karaganda Region, Kazakhstan.

In the 1930s Kypshak dried up and turned into a salt pan, but in the following decades it filled up once more and on the USSR topographic map of 1989 it was marked again as a lake.

Geography
It is an endorheic lake, having no outflow.  long river Kypshak flows into the lake from the northwest, and smaller river Akkoshkar from the west.

See also
Sor (geomorphology)
List of lakes of Kazakhstan

References

External links
SARYARKA - Steppe and Lakes of Northern Kazakhstan 
Northern Kazakhstan - Travel Guide

Lakes of Kazakhstan
Endorheic lakes of Asia
Karaganda Region
Tengiz basin